Túrricse is a village in Szabolcs-Szatmár-Bereg county, in the Northern Great Plain region of eastern Hungary. It is located in the eastern part of the county, on the Erdőhát in Satu Mare, about 10 kilometers from the Hungarian-Ukrainian-Romanian border.

Geography

History 
The name of Túrricse (Ricse) was first mentioned in a charter called Riche in 1271, when King Stephen V donated it to the ancestor of the Csaholyi family, Ponit ispán (comes).

In 1281 IV. King László confirmed Peter from the Csaholyi family in his possession here.

In 1342 his name can be found in the figures Belryche, Kynryche, from whom we can conclude that at that time the parts of the settlement of Rice and Bel and Outer Ricse were also known.

In the 15th century it belonged to the Csaholyi family, and in 1425 it was written as the property of the bishopric of Oradea.

In 1560, András Radák also got a part estate here.

In 1611, Péter Melith also took part in it, who inherited the part of Csaholyi, and Katalin Várday, the widow of Pál Nyáry and Anna Telegdi received royal donations for the whole place.

In 1662, the guards of Satu Mare Castle erupted.

In the 18th century, Rice was acquired by the Count Barkóczy family and annexed to the Jánki estate.

Here is the novel by The Poor Szilárd Borbély.

Economy

References

Populated places in Szabolcs-Szatmár-Bereg County